Crozetulus is a genus of African araneomorph spiders in the family Anapidae, first described by V. V. Hickman in 1939.

Species
 it contains four species:
Crozetulus minutus Hickman, 1939 – Crozet Is.
Crozetulus rhodesiensis Brignoli, 1981 – Namibia, Zimbabwe, South Africa
Crozetulus rotundus (Forster, 1974) – Congo
Crozetulus scutatus (Lawrence, 1964) – South Africa

References

Anapidae
Araneomorphae genera
Spiders of Africa